Souleymane Diaby (born 8 October 1999) is an Ivorian professional footballer who plays as a left-back for Winterthur.

Career
Diaby began his senior career in the Ivory Coast with Bingerville, and moved to Denguélé  briefly in 2017. From 2017 to 2021, he played with Gagnoa. On 3 July 2021, he moved to the Swiss club Winterthur. He helped Winterthur win the 2021–22 Swiss Challenge League, and earned promotion into the Swiss Super League. He extended his contract with Winterthur on 28 July 2022 for 3 more years. He made his professional debut with Winterthur in a 2–0 Swiss Super League loss to St. Gallen on 23 June 2022.

International career
Diaby is a youth international for Ivory Coast, having played for the Ivory Coast U17s and U20s. In March 2021, he received a call-up to the senior Ivory Coast national team for the first time.

Honours
Winterthur
 Swiss Challenge League: 2021–22

Individual
Toulon Tournament Best XI: 2017

References

External links
 
 SFL Profile

1999 births
Living people
People from Divo, Ivory Coast
Ivorian footballers
Ivory Coast youth international footballers
Association football fullbacks
ES Bingerville players
AS Denguélé players
SC Gagnoa players
Ligue 1 (Ivory Coast) players
FC Winterthur players
Swiss Super League players
Swiss Challenge League players
Ivorian expatriate footballers
Ivorian expatriate sportspeople in Switzerland
Expatriate footballers in Switzerland
Ivory Coast A' international footballers
2018 African Nations Championship players